Srđan Savić (9 November 1931 – 17 December 2020) was a Yugoslav sprinter. He competed in the men's 4 × 400 metres relay at the 1960 Summer Olympics.

References

1931 births
2020 deaths
Athletes (track and field) at the 1960 Summer Olympics
Yugoslav male sprinters
Bosnia and Herzegovina male athletes
Olympic athletes of Yugoslavia
People from Konjic